Odontonema cuspidatum, the mottled toothedthread, the Cardinal's guard,  or the firespike, is a species of plant in the family Acanthaceae which is endemic to Mexico, but has been introduced to Florida, Central America, South America, the West Indies, and several Pacific Islands.

References

cuspidatum